The 2013–14 Cincinnati Bearcats men's basketball team represented the University of Cincinnati during the 2013–14 NCAA Division I men's basketball season,  The Bearcats competed in the American Athletic Conference, one of two offshoots of the original Big East Conference, and were coached by Mick Cronin in his eighth season. The team played its home games on Ed Jucker Court at the Fifth Third Arena. They finished the season 27–7, 15–3 in AAC play to share the regular season conference title with Louisville. They advanced to the semifinals of the AAC tournament where they lost to UConn. They received an at-large bid NCAA tournament where they lost in the second round to Harvard.

Offseason

Departing players

Recruiting class of 2013

Recruiting class of 2014

Recruiting class of 2015

Roster

Dec 13, 2013 - Jeremiah Davis III elected to transfer to Ball State after the fall semester. After Davis's departure, Derrick Cox joined the team as a walk-on.

Depth chart

Source

Schedule

|-
!colspan=12 style=|Exhibition

|-
!colspan=12 style=|Non-conference regular season

|-
!colspan=12 style=|American Athletic Conference regular season
|-

|-
!colspan=12 style=|American Athletic Conference tournament
|-

|-
!colspan=12 style=|NCAA tournament
|-

Awards and milestones

All-American
Consensus Second Team: Sean Kilpatrick

American Athletic Conference honors

All-AAC Awards
Defensive Player of the Year: Justin Jackson
Coach of the Year: Mick Cronin
Sportsmanship Award: Sean Kilpatrick

All-AAC First Team
Sean Kilpatrick

All-AAC Second Team
Justin Jackson

Player of the Week
Week 7: Justin Jackson
Week 8: Justin Jackson
Week 9: Justin Jackson
Week 13: Sean Kilpatrick
Week 14: Sean Kilpatrick
Week 18: Sean Kilpatrick

Source

Rankings

References

External links

Cincinnati Bearcats men's basketball seasons
Cincinnati Bearcats
Cincinnati
Cincin
Cincin